Dayro Mauricio Moreno Galindo (born 16 September 1985) is a Colombian professional footballer who plays as a forward for Categoría Primera A club Atlético Bucaramanga.

Moreno began his career with Once Caldas, winning the 2004 Copa Libertadores. After that, he moved to Europe to play for Romanian club Steaua București for two years, before returning to Once Caldas in 2010 and winning the 2010 Finalizacion league title with the Manizales-based club. In 2011, he moved to Mexico's Club Tijuana, where he stayed until 2018 with loans in between to Atlético Junior, Millonarios, and Atlético Nacional. His time at Atletico Nacional was a huge success, winning the 2016 Copa Libertadores, 2017 Recopa Sudamericana, and 2017 Apertura while being the top goalscorer of both Apertura and Finalización tournaments in 2017. After being dismissed from the club due to disciplinary problems in October 2018, he transferred to Talleres de Córdoba of Argentina in December, and stayed at the club until September 2020, where he made another short return to Once Caldas.

Moreno has been capped internationally at the youth and senior level for Colombia. He was part of the squad that got third place at the Copa América Centenario.

Club career

Once Caldas
Moreno made his professional debut with Once Caldas in the 2003 season. The following year, Once Caldas won the 2004 Copa Libertadores, beating Boca Juniors in the finals, with Moreno participating for seventy minutes in the second leg. That same year, he was an unused substitute in the 2004 Intercontinental Cup, where Once Caldas lost the game in a penalty shoot-out against UEFA Champions League winners Porto. Moreno also participated in both legs of the 2005 Recopa Sudamericana, where Once Caldas lost 4–3 on aggregate to Boca Juniors.

In January 2007, Moreno was loaned out to Brazilian club Athletico Paranaense. However, he only played two games and scored once, which came on his debut against Figueirense in the first matchday of the Campeonato Brasileiro on 12 May 2007. He returned to Once Caldas in June 2007.

In the summer of 2007 there were rumors and subsequent offers for Moreno to play in the Croatian league. Argentine club Boca Juniors also had interest in him. However, after the Croatians demanded too much, the deal was cancelled and he stayed with Caldas, where he was the top scorer of the 2007 Finalizacion with 16 goals.

Steaua București

In January 2008, after an outstanding season with Once Caldas where he finished as top scorer in the 2007 Finalizacion, Romanian club Steaua București signed him for a club record US$2 million on a four-year contract. With his arrival at the club, he joined fellow Colombians Róbinson Zapata, Pepe Moreno, and Juan Toja, who were also playing for the club at the time. 

He made his debut for the club in a 2–1 loss against Politehnica Iași on 24 February. His first goal in Romania came a week later in a 3–1 victory against CFR Cluj. 

On 3 August, Moreno scored the opening goal of a 2–1 victory against FC Brașov. Ten days later, on 13 August, he scored his first UEFA Champions League goal in a 2–2 draw against Turkish club Galatasaray.

At the end of the 2008–09 season, Moreno left Steaua to his native country without the club's consent, and failed to show up for the team's preseason. As a result, he was fined €15,000 for indiscipline. The player also said he was not going to return to the club and demanded a transfer. However, Moreno eventually rejoined the club, but was demoted to the B squad for the beginning of the 2009–10 season for indiscipline. He agreed to play for the second team with a 85% salary reduction until he was prepared to come back to the first squad.

In October 2009, following a series of good performances for the B team, he was called back to the first team by new Steaua manager Mihai Stoichiță.

Moreno left the club in January 2010, citing that he was not happy playing as a midfielder instead of his natural striker position, and that his family failed to adapt to the country. Overall his time at Steaua was filled with problems; he was fined on numerous occasions for indiscipline and had problems with manager Marius Lăcătuș as well as club owner George Becali.

Return to Once Caldas
Shortly after his exit from Steaua, it was reported on Click! that Moreno wanted to join another Romanian club, FC Timisoara. However, a week later, Moreno and Timisoara cancelled negotiations, and on 24 January 2010, he returned to Once Caldas on a transfer worth approximately €500,000. On 26 February, he scored the winner in a 2–1 home victory against Sao Paulo in the Copa Libertadores. In December, he scored in a 2–1 loss against Deportes Tolima in the first leg of the Finalizacion finals, but Once Caldas later won the title with a 3–1 victory in the second leg at Estadio Palogrande, with Moreno winning the golden boot in the process, scoring 16 goals.

Club Tijuana
In the summer of 2011 he was linked with a transfer to Portugal's Sporting Lisbon, but the deal was canceled after he failed to agree on personal terms. On 2 June 2011, it was announced that Moreno would move to Liga MX team Club Tijuana for a fee of US$3.5 million. In January 2012, the Colombian forward requested to leave Tijuana after having a minor facial fracture while on vacation.

Loans to Caldas, Junior, and Millonarios 
In February 2012, he rejoined Once Caldas on loan after rejecting an offer from Universidad de Chile.

Moreno then joined Junior on a year-long loan in late July 2012. On 2 September, he scored 2 goals in a 4–3 win against Patriotas Boyacá. On 7 April 2013, he scored two goals to help his team comeback from a 1–0 deficit against Cúcuta Deportivo and win the match 2–1.

On 6 July, Ascenso MX side Correcaminos UAT announced that Moreno would join them for the upcoming season.  However, the Colombian striker changed his mind and joined Millonarios instead, after stating that he did not want to join a Second Division side. 
On 18 August, he scored a hat trick in a 3–0 win against Once Caldas. He scored another hat-trick on 29 March 2014, in a 4–0 win over Patriotas.

Return to Club Tijuana 
On 10 July 2014, Club Tijuana announced that Moreno had rejoined the club. On 28 February 2015, he scored a last minute winner to give Tijuana a 3–2 victory against Pachuca, after having trailed by two goals at halftime. On 12 September, at Estadio Caliente, he scored twice against Chivas Guadalajara in a 2–1 victory, with his team having trailed 1–0 at halftime. On 12 February 2016, he scored a double in an 2–1 away victory against Tigres UANL at Estadio Universitario. Twelve days later, he scored a double in a 4–0 win against Atlas in the Copa MX. 

On 16 July, Moreno scored a brace in a 2–0 win vs Atletico Morelia. Moreno was the top scorer of the 2016 Apertura alongside Raul Ruidiaz, with 11 goals.

Atlético Nacional
On 8 January 2017, Moreno signed with Atlético Nacional on a year-long loan with option to purchase. He made his debut on 9 February against Atlético Bucaramanga, and three days later, scored his first two goals for the club in a 3–0 victory against Rionegro Águilas. On 10 May, he scored 2 goals in the 2017 Recopa Sudamericana second leg against Chapecoense that contributed to his team's 4–1 victory. Moreno scored a brace, including an injury time winning goal, to contribute to his club's 3–2 victory after having trailed 0–2 against Jaguares de Córdoba on 4 June. 

On 18 June, he scored a penalty in the second leg of the finals against Deportivo Cali, which ended in a 5–1 victory for Nacional. Nacional eventually won the title 5–3 on aggregate, having come from a 2–0 deficit in the first leg. On 17 September, Moreno scored a brace, including an injury time game winner, in a 3–2 win against Millonarios. A week later, he scored another brace in a 2–0 victory against Envigado. 

On 14 October 2018 he had a fight inside the pitch with teammate Jeison Lucumí in a match against Deportivo Cali. They argued over who should take a free kick. He was expelled from the team on 16 October due to reiterated disciplinary behavior. Lucumi was also fined as a result.

Talleres
On 18 December 2018, Moreno joined Argentine Primera División side Talleres on a two-year deal.

International career
Moreno played 7 games for the Colombia under-20 squad that won the 2005 South American U-20 Championship. He also made 3 appearances for the same team at the 2005 FIFA World Youth Championship. In total he made 10 appearances for the u-20 team and didn't score any goals.

Moreno made his Senior team debut on 1 March 2006 against Venezuela. He scored his first goal on 20 November 2007, the game-winner in a 2–1 victory against Argentina. On 6 June 2011, he was included in the 23-man squad chosen by coach Hernán Darío Gómez for the 2011 Copa América.

After a five-year-absence from the national team, he returned and opened the scoring in a 3–1 friendly win against Haiti on 29 May 2016. A few days later, he was included in José Pékerman’s squad for the Copa América Centenario. Moreno played three games at the tournament and started the match against Costa Rica, but failed to score and didn’t complete 90 minutes in any of the games he played.

Moreno currently has 31 caps for the national team and has scored 3 goals.

International goals
As of match played 18 June 2016. Colombia score listed first, score column indicates score after each Moreno goal.

Career statistics

Club

 Notes

International

Honors

Club
Once Caldas
Categoría Primera A (2): 2003 Apertura, 2010 Finalización
Copa Libertadores: 2004
Atlético Nacional
Categoría Primera A: 2017 Apertura
Recopa Sudamericana: 2017

International
Colombia
Copa América: 2016 (Third Place)

Individual
Categoría Primera A top goalscorer (6): 2007 Finalización, 2010 Finalización, 2013 Finalización, 2014 Apertura, 2017 Apertura, 2017 Finalización
Liga MX Golden Boot (Shared): Apertura 2016
Liga MX Best XI: Apertura 2016

References

External links

Dayro Moreno at BDFA.com.ar
Dayro Moreno at Oncecaldas.com.co 
Dayro Moreno at Copa Libertadores.com

1985 births
Living people
Colombian footballers
Colombian expatriate footballers
Colombia international footballers
Colombia under-20 international footballers
Once Caldas footballers
Club Athletico Paranaense players
FC Steaua București players
FC Steaua II București players
Club Tijuana footballers
Atlético Junior footballers
Millonarios F.C. players
Atlético Nacional footballers
Talleres de Córdoba footballers
Oriente Petrolero players
Categoría Primera A players
Campeonato Brasileiro Série A players
Argentine Primera División players
Liga I players
Liga II players
Liga MX players
Bolivian Primera División players
2011 Copa América players
Copa América Centenario players
Expatriate footballers in Argentina
Expatriate footballers in Romania
Expatriate footballers in Mexico
Expatriate footballers in Brazil
Expatriate footballers in Bolivia
Colombian expatriate sportspeople in Argentina
Colombian expatriate sportspeople in Romania
Colombian expatriate sportspeople in Mexico
Colombian expatriate sportspeople in Brazil
Colombian expatriate sportspeople in Bolivia
People from Tolima Department
Association football forwards